This is a list of mayors of Oshawa, Ontario, from its incorporation as a town in 1879 until the present day.

Town of Oshawa
William Henry Gibbs - 1879
F. Rae - 1880–87
John Cowan - 1887
Robert McGee - 1887–89
W.F. Cowan - 1889–96
W.J. Hare - 1897
Frederick Luther Fowke - 1898
Robert McLaughlin - 1899
Frederick Luther Fowke - 1900–06
Thomas Erlin Kaiser - 1907–08
R.H. James - 1909
W. E. N. Sinclair - 1910–11
Jno. Gibson - 1912
E.S. Edmondson - 1913–14
W. E. N. Sinclair - 1915
Gordon Daniel Conant - 1916–17
F.L. Mason - 1918
John Stacey - 1919–21
W. J. Trick - 1922–23

City of Oshawa
W.J. Trick - 1924
Herbert Schell - 1925
Robert Preston - 1926–28
T.B. Mitchell - 1929–30
Ernest Marks - 1931
P.A. Macdonald - 1932
W. E. N. Sinclair - 1933–35
John Stacey - 1936
Alex Hall - 1937
Alex McLeese - 1938
J.A. Coleman - 1939
J.C. Anderson - 1940–41
W.H. Gifford - 1942–43
A.G. Davis - 1944
W.H. Gifford - 1945
Frank McCallum - 1946–48
Michael Starr - 1949–52
John Naylor - 1953–54
Norman Down - 1955
John Naylor - 1956–57
Lyman Gifford - 1958–60
Christine Thomas - 1961–62
Lyman Gifford - 1963–66
Ernest Marks - 1967–68
Hayward Murdoch - 1969
Bruce Mackey - 1970
Edward McNeely - 1971–73
James Potticary - 1973–81
Allan Pilkey - 1981–90
Allan J. Mason - 1990–91
Nancy Diamond - 1991–2003
John Gray - 2003–10
John Henry - 2010–18
Dan Carter - 2018–present

References

Oshawa